Jaroslav Korbela (born May 20, 1957 in České Budějovice, Czechoslovakia) is an ice hockey player who played for the Czechoslovak national team. He won a silver medal at the 1984 Winter Olympics.

Career statistics

Regular season and playoffs

International

References

External links
 

1957 births
HK Dukla Trenčín players
Ice hockey players at the 1984 Winter Olympics
Living people
Medalists at the 1984 Winter Olympics
Motor České Budějovice players
Olympic ice hockey players of Czechoslovakia
Olympic medalists in ice hockey
Olympic silver medalists for Czechoslovakia
Sportspeople from České Budějovice
Czechoslovak expatriate sportspeople in Austria
Expatriate ice hockey players in Austria
Czechoslovak expatriate ice hockey people
Czechoslovak ice hockey left wingers
Czech ice hockey left wingers